Glaube Araújo Feitosa (born April 9, 1973) is a Brazilian former kickboxer and a kyokushin full contact karate practitioner who was competing in K-1. In 2005, Feitosa won K-1 World Grand Prix 2005 in Las Vegas tournament and was a K-1 World Grand Prix 2005 finalist. He has gone the distance with some of the top fighters in his time, such as Peter Aerts, Remy Bonjasky, Semmy Schilt and Errol Zimmerman. An accomplished karate fighter, he was known for his use of the "question mark kick," utilizing the technique in several knockout victories in his career. Feitosa also holds wins over Cheick Kongo, Alistair Overeem, Ruslan Karaev, and Paul Slowinski.

Biography and career
A native of Brazil, Feitosa began training in Kyokushin karate from a young age, and fought in several world championship tournaments. While living in Tokyo, Japan he fought and trained in the IKO1 Kyokushin - Team Ichigeki at the Ichigeki Plaza.

On April 30, 2005, Feitosa won the K-1 World Grand Prix 2005 in Las Vegas tournament with a unanimous decision over Dewey Cooper and two knockouts over Carter Williams and Gary Goodridge.  At the eliminations he lost by decision to Semmy Schilt.

As a reserve fighter Glaube beat Goodridge by unanimous decision and advanced to the semi finals after Peter Aerts had to pull out due to a rib fracture, where he knocked out Musashi with a flying knee to get to the finals where he rematched Semmy Schilt. Glaube lost the fight by a first-round KO after a knee to the head.

As a WGP runner up he fought at the 2006 eliminations, beating Paul Slowinski by unanimous decision. He knocked out Ruslan Karaev in the first round and advanced to the semi finals,  losing by TKO in the second round to Peter Aerts.

On September 29, 2007 Feitosa met German kickboxer Chalid Arrab at the K-1 World GP 2007 in Seoul Final 16. He won the fight by unanimous decision and qualified himself for K-1 World GP 2007 Final held on December 8, 2007 at the Yokohama Arena, Japan.

Feitosa met two-time defending champion Semmy Schilt. Glaube lost a unanimous decision to Semmy for the third time.

After knocking out Alex Roberts in March 2008, Glaube fought for the new Heavyweight title against Badr Hari at the K-1 World GP 2008 in Fukuoka. Glaube was knocked out in the first round.

At the K-1 World GP 2008 Final 16 Glaube fought the 2008 Amsterdam Champion, Errol Zimmerman. Glaube lost a unanimous decision after being battered by the heavy hands of his opponent over three rounds.

In 2009 Glaube knocked out Junichi Sawayashiki and was voted in by the fans to fight at the K-1 World Grand Prix 2009 Final 16, in a rematch against Errol Zimmerman. Zimmerman won by decision. Glaube has most recently been recruited by Maurico Shogun Rua to help him prepare for his upcoming fight with Lyoto Machida.

Titles
 K-1 World Grand Prix 2009 - Final 8
 K-1 World Grand Prix 2008 - Final 8
 K-1 World Grand Prix 2007 - Final 8
 K-1 World Grand Prix 2006 - Final 8 (3rd place)
 K-1 World Grand Prix 2005 - Final 8 (2nd place)
 2005 K-1 World Grand Prix Runner Up
 2005 K-1 World Grand Prix in Las Vegas Champion
 2005 MVP in Kyokushin Karate World Cup in Paris
 2003 No.4 in 8th Kyokushin World Open Tournament Championship
 1999 No.4 in 7th Kyokushin World Open Tournament Championship
 1997 2nd Place in All World Karate-do Championship-Heavyweight
 1997 America's Cup Karate-do Champion
 1997 All South American Karate-do Champion
 1997 All Brazil Karate-do Champion
 1996 All Brazil Karate-do Champion
 1995 No.8 in 6th Kyokushin World Open Tournament Championship

Kickboxing record

|-  bgcolor="#FFBBBB"
| 2009-09-26 || Loss ||align=left| Errol Zimmerman || K-1 World Grand Prix 2009 Final 16 || Seoul, Korea || Decision (Majority) || 3 || 3:00 || 17-17-1
|-  bgcolor="#CCFFCC"
| 2009-03-28 || Win ||align=left| Junichi Sawayashiki || K-1 World Grand Prix 2009 in Yokohama || Yokohama, Japan || KO (Left Straight Punch) || 2 || 0:48 || 17-16-1
|-  bgcolor="#FFBBBB"
| 2008-09-27 || Loss ||align=left| Errol Zimmerman || K-1 World Grand Prix 2008 in Seoul Final 16 || Seoul, Korea || Decision (Unanimous) || 3 || 3:00 || 16-16-1
|-  bgcolor="#FFBBBB"
| 2008-06-29 || Loss ||align=left| Badr Hari || K-1 World GP 2008 in Fukuoka || Fukuoka, Japan || KO (Right hook) || 1 || 2:26 || 16-15-1
|-
! style=background:white colspan=9 |
|-
|-  bgcolor="#CCFFCC"
| 2008-04-13 || Win ||align=left| Alex Roberts || K-1 World GP 2008 in Yokohama || Yokohama, Japan || KO (Left high kick) || 2 || 1:58 || 16-14-1
|-  bgcolor="#FFBBBB"
| 2007-12-08 || Loss ||align=left| Semmy Schilt || K-1 World Grand Prix 2007 Final || Tokyo, Japan || Decision (Unanimous) || 3 || 3:00 || 15-14-1
|-  bgcolor="#CCFFCC"
| 2007-09-29 || Win ||align=left| Chalid Arrab || K-1 World GP 2007 in Seoul Final 16 || Seoul, Korea || Decision (Unanimous) || 3 || 3:00 || 15-13-1
|-  bgcolor="#FFBBBB"
| 2007-04-28 || Loss ||align=left| Remy Bonjasky || K-1 World Grand Prix 2007 in Hawaii || Honolulu, Hawaii || Decision (Majority) || 3 || 3:00 || 14-13-1
|-  bgcolor="#FFBBBB"
| 2006-12-02 || Loss ||align=left| Peter Aerts || K-1 World Grand Prix 2006, Semi Final || Tokyo, Japan || TKO (Referee stoppage) || 2 || 1:02 || 14-12-1
|-  bgcolor="#CCFFCC"
| 2006-12-02 || Win ||align=left| Ruslan Karaev || K-1 World Grand Prix 2006 Quarter Final || Tokyo, Japan || KO (Left High kick) || 1 || 1:11 || 14-11-1
|-  bgcolor="#CCFFCC"
| 2006-09-30 || Win ||align=left| Paul Slowinski || K-1 World Grand Prix 2006 in Osaka Opening Round || Osaka, Japan || Decision (Unanimous) || 3 || 3:00 || 13-11-1
|-  bgcolor="#CCFFCC"
| 2006-07-30 || Win ||align=left| Musashi || K-1 World Grand Prix 2006 in Sapporo || Sapporo, Japan || Decision (Unanimous) || 3 || 3:00 || 12-11-1
|-  bgcolor="#FFBBBB"
| 2005-11-19 || Loss ||align=left| Semmy Schilt || K-1 World Grand Prix 2005 Final || Tokyo, Japan || KO (Knee strike) || 1 || 0:48 || 11-11-1
|-
! style=background:white colspan=9 |
|-
|-  bgcolor="#CCFFCC"
| 2005-11-19 || Win ||align=left| Musashi || K-1 World Grand Prix 2005 Semi Final || Tokyo, Japan || KO (Jumping knee) || 2 || 1:05 || 11-10-1
|-  bgcolor="#CCFFCC"
| 2005-11-19 || Win ||align=left| Gary Goodridge || K-1 World Grand Prix 2005 Reserve Fight || Tokyo, Japan || Decision (Unanimous) || 3 || 3:00 || 10-10-1
|-  bgcolor="#FFBBBB"
| 2005-09-23 || Loss ||align=left| Semmy Schilt || K-1 World Grand Prix 2005 in Osaka - Final Elimination || Osaka, Japan || Decision (Unanimous) || 3 || 3:00 || 9-10-1
|-  bgcolor="#CCFFCC"
| 2005-04-30 || Win ||align=left| Gary Goodridge || K-1 World Grand Prix 2005 in Las Vegas Final || Las Vegas, Nevada || KO (Left High kick) || 1 || 2:40 || 9-9-1
|-
! style=background:white colspan=9 |
|-
|-  bgcolor="#CCFFCC"
| 2005-04-30 || Win ||align=left| Carter Williams || K-1 World Grand Prix 2005 in Las Vegas Semi Final || Las Vegas, Nevada || TKO (Ref stop/three knockdowns) || 2 || 2:56 || 8-9-1
|-  bgcolor="#CCFFCC"
| 2005-04-30 || Win ||align=left| Dewey Cooper || K-1 World Grand Prix 2005 in Las Vegas Quarter Final || Las Vegas, Nevada || Decision (Unanimous) || 3 || 3:00 || 7-9-1
|-  bgcolor="#CCFFCC"
| 2005-03-19 || Win ||align=left| Cheick Kongo || Ichigeki Paris 2005 || Paris, France || Decision (Unanimous) || 3 || 3:00 || 6-9-1
|-  bgcolor="#FFBBBB"
| 2004-09-25 || Loss ||align=left| Ernesto Hoost || K-1 World Grand Prix 2004 Final Elimination || Osaka, Japan || Decision (Unanimous) || 3 || 3:00 || 5-9-1
|-  bgcolor="#CCFFCC"
| 2004-07-17 || Win ||align=left| Toa || K-1 World Grand Prix 2004 in Seoul || Seoul, Korea || KO (Left high kick) || 1 || 1:49 || 5-8-1
|-  bgcolor="#CCFFCC"
| 2004-05-30 || Win ||align=left| Alistair Overeem || Kyokushin vs K-1 2004 All Out Battle || Tokyo, Japan || KO (Left Hook) || 1 || 2:13 || 4-8-1
|-  bgcolor="#CCFFCC"
| 2003-02-22 || Win ||align=left| Pavel Majer || Ichigeki 2003 Japan || Japan || KO || 3 ||  || 3-8-1
|-  bgcolor="#FFBBBB"
| 2002-10-05 || Loss ||align=left| Peter Aerts || K-1 World Grand Prix 2002 Final Elimination || Osaka, Japan || Decision (Unanimous) || 3 || 3:00 || 2-8-1
|-  bgcolor="#FFBBBB"
| 2002-07-14 || Loss ||align=left| Martin Holm || K-1 World Grand Prix 2002 in Fukuoka || Fukuoka, Japan || KO (Punch) || 1 || 2:20 || 2-7-1
|-  bgcolor="#c5d2ea"
| 2002-03-03 || Draw ||align=left| Musashi || K-1 World Grand Prix 2002 in Nagoya || Nagoya, Japan || Decision Draw || 5 || 3:00 || 2-6-1
|-  bgcolor="#FFBBBB"
| 2001-10-08 || Loss ||align=left| Michael McDonald || K-1 World Grand Prix 2001 in Fukuoka || Fukuoka, Japan || Decision (Unanimous) || 3 || 3:00 || 2-6
|-  bgcolor="#CCFFCC"
| 2001-03-17 || Win ||align=left| Tsuyoshi Nakasako || K-1 Gladiators 2001 || Yokohama, Japan || KO (Left high kick) || 2 || 0:57 || 2-5
|-  bgcolor="#FFBBBB"
| 2000-10-09 || Loss ||align=left| Mirko Cro Cop || K-1 World Grand Prix 2000 in Fukuoka || Fukuoka, Japan || Decision (Unanimous) || 3 || 3:00 || 1-5
|-  bgcolor="#FFBBBB"
| 2000-08-05 || Loss ||align=left| Tomasz Kucharzewski || K-1 USA Championships 2000 semi final || Las Vegas, Nevada || TKO || 1 || 2:03 || 1-4
|-  bgcolor="#CCFFCC"
| 2000-08-05 || Win ||align=left| George Randolph || K-1 USA Championships 2000 quarter final || Las Vegas, Nevada || KO (Punch) || 1 || 1:07 || 1-3
|-  bgcolor="#FFBBBB"
| 2000-04-23 || Loss ||align=left| Andy Hug || K-1 The Millennium || Osaka, Japan || Decision (Unanimous) || 5 || 3:00 || 0-3
|-  bgcolor="#FFBBBB"
| 1998-09-27 || Loss ||align=left| Masaaki Satake || K-1 World Grand Prix '98 Opening Round || Osaka, Japan || Decision (Majority) || 5 || 3:00 || 0-2
|-  bgcolor="#FFBBBB"
| 1998-07-18 || Loss ||align=left| Mike Bernardo || K-1 Dream '98 || Nagoya, Japan || TKO || 1 || 1:42 || 0-1
|-
| colspan=9 | Legend:

See also 
List of K-1 events
List of K-1 champions
List of male kickboxers

References

External links
Profile at K-1

1973 births
Living people
Brazilian male kickboxers
Heavyweight kickboxers
Brazilian male karateka
Sportspeople from São Paulo
Brazilian expatriates in Japan
Kyokushin kaikan practitioners